Eastar may refer to:

Eastar Jet, a South Korean airline
Chery Eastar, a Chinese mid-size car
Chery Eastar Cross, a Chinese compact MPV
Eastman Eastar, a brand of polysester polycyclohexylenedimethylene terephthalate

See also

Easter (disambiguation)
East (disambiguation)
Star (disambiguation)

East Star (disambiguation)
Eastern Star (disambiguation)
Star of the East (disambiguation)